SFC may refer to:

Science, technology and engineering
 Space-filling curve, a curve whose ranges contain the entire 2-dimensional unit square
 Supercritical fluid chromatography, a form of normal phase chromatography
 Specific fuel consumption (disambiguation)
 Brake specific fuel consumption (BSFC), the fuel consumption of a shaft engine in terms of its output power
 Thrust specific fuel consumption (TSFC), the fuel efficiency of a jet engine design in terms of its thrust efficiency
 Super Famicom, the Japanese version of the Super NES video game console
 Shop floor control, the logistic term to follow up the progress and steer the shop floor production plan or schedule

Computing
 Sequential function chart, a graphical programming language used for programmable logic controllers
 System File Checker, a utility in Microsoft Windows

Organizations
 San Francisco County
 Sea Fisheries Committee, regional fisheries bodies in England and Wales
 Securities and Futures Commission, a Hong Kong regulator
 Software Freedom Conservancy, a not-for-profit organization supporting free software/open source software projects
 South Florida Council, a scouting organization
 Southern Fandom Confederation, an association of science fiction fans
 Strategic Forces Command, part of India's Nuclear Command Authority
 Students for Free Culture, a student activist organization

Education
 Saad Foundation College, a private residential secondary school in Malacca, Malaysia
 Santa Fe College, a college in Gainesville, Florida, US
 Scottish Funding Council, the public body that distributes funding from the Scottish Government to the country's colleges and universities
 Shonan Fujisawa Campus, Keio University, Fujisawa, Japan
 Singapore Flying College, a wholly owned subsidiary of Singapore Airlines Group
 Sixth form college, an educational institution
 Saint Ferdinand College, a catholic educational institution in the Philippines
 St. Francis College, a private liberal arts college in Brooklyn Heights, New York, US
 Sioux Falls Christian Schools, a private elementary, middle, and high school located in Sioux Falls, South Dakota

Politics
 Swiss Federal Council, the executive body of the Swiss Government
 Senate Finance Committee, standing committee of the United States Senate

Sport

Association football clubs

England
 Scarborough F.C. (dissolved)
 Sheffield F.C.
 Southampton F.C.
 Southport F.C.
 Stamford F.C.
 Stevenage F.C.

Scotland
 Stranraer F.C.
 Stenhousemuir F.C.
 Spartans F.C.

Thailand
 Saraburi F.C.
 Sisaket F.C.
 Suphanburi F.C.

Other places
 Santos Futebol Clube, Brazil
 Seattle Sounders FC, United States
 Seongnam FC, Korea
 Servette FC, Switzerland 
 Sevilla FC, Spain 
 SFC Opava, Czech Republic 
 Shelbourne F.C., Ireland 
 Sriwijaya F.C., Indonesia
 Stallion F.C., Philippines
 Sydney FC, Australia 
 Syrianska FC, Sweden

Other meanings in sport
 All-Ireland Senior Football Championship, in Gaelic football

Other uses
 San Francisco Chronicle, a newspaper
 State Street Financial Center, the headquarters of State Street Corporation in Boston, Massachusetts
 Semi fixed cost, an expense which is incurred only if the entity had some activity, but is not dependent on the amount of activity
 Stock-Flow consistent model, in economics
 Sergeant first class, the seventh enlisted rank in the US Army
 Southern fried chicken, a dish consisting of chicken pieces
 Suspended Family Coaster, a roller coaster design by Dutch manufacturer Vekoma
 Starfleet Command, headquarters/command center of Starfleet in Star Trek

See also
 Starfleet Command (disambiguation)